Douala Athletic Club 2000 is a football club in Cameroon.

History 
Douala Athletic Club was founded in the year 2000. In 2002, the club was promoted to the Province du Littoral, the then-second tier of football in Cameroon. DAC played eleven times in that league, before in 2013 winning MTN Elite Two and promoted to Elite One, the top tier.

Stadium 
They play at 30,000 capacity Stade de la Réunification in Douala.

Notess

Football clubs in Cameroon
Sports clubs in Cameroon